Lemke is a German surname.

Geographical distribution
As of 2014, 59.6% of all known bearers of the surname Lemke were residents of Germany (frequency 1:2,598), 27.7% of the United States (1:3,061,452), 4.6% of Brazil (1:86,475), 2.1% of Canada (1:33,211) and 2.1% of Poland (1:34,335).

In Germany, the frequency of the surname was higher than national average (1:2,598) in the following states:
 1. Mecklenburg-Vorpommern (1:599)
 2. Brandenburg (1:837)
 3. Schleswig-Holstein (1:969)
 4. Berlin (1:1,102)
 5. Bremen (1:1,445)
 6. Hamburg (1:1,642)
 7. Lower Saxony (1:1,716)
 8. Saxony-Anhalt (1:1,977)

People
Anthony Lemke, actor
Birsel Lemke, environmentalist
Carlton E. Lemke, mathematician
Helmut Lemke (1907-1990), German politician
James Lemke (born 1988), Australian professional tennis player
James U Lemke (1929–2019), American physicist and entrepreneur
Jay Lemke, education scientist
LeRoy Lemke (1935–1991), American lawyer and politician
Leslie Lemke, musical savant
Lev Lemke, actor
Mark Lemke, baseball player
Peter Henry Lemke, Benedictine
Richard R. Lemke (1930-2016), American farmer and politician
Siegfried Lemke, World War II Luftwaffe ace
Steffi Lemke (born 1968), German politician
Steve Lemke, guitar player
William Lemke, politician
Wolf Lemke, aircraft designer
Dave Lemke, original bass player of Imagine Dragons

References

German-language surnames
Surnames of German origin

de:Lemke (Begriffsklärung)
fr:Lemke
nl:Lemke
pl:Lemke
ru:Лемке